Dubai Municipality is the Government of Dubai municipal body with jurisdiction over city services and the upkeep of facilities in the Emirate of Dubai, United Arab Emirates and reports directly to the Dubai Executive Council. The agency is led by a Director-General that sits at the Dubai Executive Council. The department has been led by Director-General Eng. Dawood Abdul Rahman Al Hajiri since 2018.

History 
It was established in 1954 by the Crown Prince of Dubai, Rashid bin Saeed Al Maktoum. In 2001, the municipality embarked on an e-government project to provide 40 of its city services online through its web portal.

Organisation and Governance 
Dubai Municipality consists of 2 sectors, the Corporate Support Service Sector, and the Planning and Governance Sector, both led by Chief Executive Officers that report to the Director-General. In addition to the sectors, the DM has 4 separate agencies led by Directors, each with their own departments and jurisdictions.

 Waste and Sewage Agency
 Public Facilities Agency
 Environment, Health & Safety Agency
 Buildings Regulations & Permits Agency

World Migratory Birds 
The theme of World Migratory Birds Day 2020 was “Birds Connect Our World”. Dubai Municipality celebrated World Migratory Birds Day.

References

External links 
 
 Dubai Municipality e-government web portal

Government agencies of Dubai